Wilton Brad Watson (July 24, 1955July 8, 2020) was an American author and academic.  Originally from Mississippi, he worked and lived in Alabama, Florida, California, Boston, and Wyoming.  He was a professor at the University of Wyoming until his death. Watson published four books – two novels and two collections of short stories – to critical acclaim.

Early life
Watson was born in Meridian, Mississippi on July 24, 1955.  He was the second of three sons of Robert Earl Watson and Bonnie Clay.  He married his high school sweetheart and had a son together before twelfth grade.  They moved to Los Angeles after finishing high school, and worked as a garbage truck driver while aspiring to become an actor.  He subsequently returned home to Mississippi after his older brother, Clay, died in a car accident.  At the urging of his family, he went back into education, attending Meridian Junior College and then Mississippi State University, where he graduated with a degree in English.  Subsequently, he undertook postgraduate studies at the University of Alabama, obtaining a Master of Fine Arts in writing and American literature from that institution.

Career
After working as a newspaper reporter and editor and at an advertising agency, he returned to the University of Alabama to teach creative writing; he also worked for the university's public relations department. While at Alabama he published Last Days of the Dog-Men (1996), which had taken him ten years to write and won him the Sue Kaufman Prize for First Fiction and The Great Lakes New Writers Award. Amy Grace Lloyd, writing for The New York Times twenty years later, called it "a near-perfect story collection". In 1997 he moved to Harvard University and lived in Boston until 2002. He was a writer in residence at the University of West Florida, the University of Alabama, the University of Mississippi, and the University of California, Irvine. Beginning in 2005, he taught at the University of Wyoming, where he was a professor of creative writing and literature in the Department of Visual & Literary Arts.

Watson's 2002 novel The Heaven of Mercury was a finalist for the National Book Award. His 2010 collection of short stories Aliens in the Prime of Their Lives received positive reviews in The New York Times and the Boston Phoenix; its stories contained "divorces, miscarriages, an argument that ends in bungled gunplay, a joint-custody visitation, even a touch of incest", and Watson himself considered some of them some of the funniest stuff he'd ever written. His work has appeared in The New Yorker. The book was a finalist for The PEN/Faulkner Award in 2011.  Two years later, Watson received the Award in Letters from The American Academy of Arts and Letters.

His 2016 novel Miss Jane is set in Depression-era Mississippi; its main character, Jane Chisolm, is inspired by one of his great-aunts, a woman with an unknown (to family survivors) urogenital condition that rendered her incontinent and possibly made her incapable of having vaginal sex. Watson has stated in interviews that he could not write the book until he found a medical condition that would seem to fit what little family survivors knew and remembered about his great-aunt's condition. The novel was praised by critics, with Silas House saying it "takes Watson's writing to new heights". The novel was one of ten books long-listed for The National Book Award in Fiction in 2016. It was an ebook bestseller on Amazon.com in 2020.

Subject matter and style
Watson is frequently called a Southern writer, and acknowledged his heritage and his love for family and friends, particularly after moving to Wyoming in 2005. At community college in Meridian, he became inspired by William Faulkner, Robert Penn Warren, and Flannery O'Connor. He is praised for his portrayal of Southern issues and problems (racism and segregation being one of the subject matters of Heaven of Mercury), but commented also on stereotypical simplifications of the South in other parts of America:For all the ways [the South] is struggling and, yes, deficient, or failing, flailing, it is also a place full of wonderful people, and possibly one of the most diverse places in the country. Not that everyone gets along. There is ignorance, there is racism. There are also more proud people trying to change that than might be apparent from the results at the polling booths. But writing the book, I was just thinking about these people, trying to make them real people in the reader’s mind. Here’s an anecdote, though. I was at a tea party or the like at a famous university in the early stages of researching Miss Jane, and I asked the host--who was a pediatrician, for goodness sake--if he could speculate on what might have been my great aunt’s condition. His response was, "You're from Mississippi, right? Is there any history of incest in your family?"

Death
Watson died on July 8, 2020, at his home in Laramie, Wyoming.  He was 64; his wife believed it was due to heart failure.

Books

Anthologies

Awards
 Sue Kaufman Prize for First Fiction, American Academy of Arts and Letters (Last Days of the Dog-Men)
 Great Lakes Colleges Association New Writers Award
 Finalist for the National Book Award (The Heaven of Mercury)
 Mississippi Institute of Arts and Letters Award in Fiction (2003 and 2011)
 Southern Book Critics Circle Award in Fiction
 2004 National Endowment of the Arts Grant in Fiction
 Finalist, 2010 PEN/Faulkner Award for Fiction (Aliens in the Prime of Their Lives)
 Finalist, 2011 St. Francis College Literary Award ("Aliens in the Prime of Their Lives")
 2011 Guggenheim Fellowship
 2013 Award in Letters, American Academy of Arts and Letters
 2016 Longlist, National Book Award in Fiction, "Miss Jane"
 2017 Harper Lee Award

References

External links

 Interview with Brad Watson in Granta, Winter 2009

Mississippi State University alumni
University of Alabama faculty
University of Wyoming faculty
People from Meridian, Mississippi
1955 births
2020 deaths
21st-century American novelists
PEN/Faulkner Award for Fiction winners
Novelists from Alabama